Dina Eduardovna Galiakbarova (born 2 November 1991) is a Russian sabre fencer, three-time World team champion (2010, 2011, and 2012) and twice European team champion (2010, 2011).

She was Junior European champion in 2010 at Lobnya, European U23 champion in 2011 at Kazan and Junior World champion the same year at the Dead Sea.

External links 
 
  (archive)
  (archive)

1991 births
Living people
Sportspeople from Bishkek
Russian female sabre fencers
Universiade medalists in fencing
Universiade silver medalists for Russia
Medalists at the 2009 Summer Universiade
Medalists at the 2013 Summer Universiade